Pathani Samanta Planetarium is a planetarium in the city of Bhubaneswar in India named after astronomer Pathani Samanta. It was founded for creating awareness about astronomy . It carries on activities like night sky viewing, audio visual programs and poster shows. It also displays various astronomical devices.

The planetarium was established by Science and Technology Department, Government of Odisha.

Gallery

References

Buildings and structures in Bhubaneswar
Education in Bhubaneswar
Tourist attractions in Bhubaneswar
Planetaria in India
Year of establishment missing